The canton of Figeac-1 is an administrative division of the Lot department, southern France. It was created at the French canton reorganisation which came into effect in March 2015. Its seat is in Figeac.

It consists of the following communes:
 
Bagnac-sur-Célé
Capdenac
Cuzac
Felzins
Figeac (partly)
Lentillac-Saint-Blaise
Linac
Lunan
Montredon
Prendeignes
Saint-Félix
Saint-Jean-Mirabel
Saint-Perdoux
Viazac

References

Cantons of Lot (department)